Westbrook High School (WHS) is a public high school in Westbrook, Maine, United States. The school serves grades 9 through 12, and usually enrolls between 600 and 800 students each year. It is part of the Westbrook School Department. The school competes in the Southern Maine Athletics Association (SMAA) and  Class A athletics, as governed by the Maine Principals' Association. The school mascot is the "Blue Blazes".

History 
Old Westbrook High School was previously located on Main Street in downtown Westbrook. The school moved to its current location in 1954. The school underwent an extensive addition in 1961 and renovation in 1992.

Sports
Westbrook High School is known for its successful basketball program. The boys' basketball team won Class A state championships in 1925, 1927, 1951, 1972, 1975 and 1984 as well as Western Maine Championships in 1925, 1927, 1951, 1969, 1972, 1975, 1984, 1994, 1996 and 2000.

Students from Westbrook High School's music program have participated in national competitions. In 1993, the marching band competed in the Tournament of Roses Parade in Pasadena, California. In 1995, the marching band competed in the Citrus Bowl in Orlando, Florida, and again in 1999. Most recently, in 2003, the marching band attended the Fiesta Bowl in Phoenix, Arizona.

The Westbrook High School Bell Ringers are a group of ten student-athletes that perform with a set of forty-four Dutch handbells throughout southern Maine.

Notable alumni 
 Trevor Bates, NFL linebacker
 Kevin Eastman, comic book artist and writer
 Steve Lavigne, comic book illustrator
 Morgan Rielly, member of the Maine House of Representatives
 Ronald Usher, former member of the Maine Legislature
 Joseph Vachon, U.S. Army brigadier general

References

External links
Westbrook School Department

Public high schools in Maine
Buildings and structures in Westbrook, Maine
High schools in Cumberland County, Maine